"Rednecker" (stylized in all caps) is a song written and recorded by American country music singer Hardy. It was released on March 4, 2019 as the first single from his October 19, 2018 debut EP This Ole Boy.

Background
In an interview with The Boot, Hardy explained the song's origin.

Music video
The music video, directed by Justin Clough, was shot on a farm in Cottontown, Tennessee and features some of Hardy's songwriting collaborators: Brett Tyler, Joe Clemmons and Benjy Davis. The group was able to relax and have a fun day just being buddies and hanging out. Their day consisted of mudding, mattress surfing via his jacked-up 4x4, shooting catfish in a lake, paintballing, shotgunning Busch Lights and putting "a little more spit in (his) chaw," contest style.

Charts

Weekly charts

Year-end charts

Certifications

References

2019 debut singles
2019 songs
Big Loud singles
Song recordings produced by Joey Moi
Songs_written_by_Hardy_(singer)
Hardy (singer) songs